Lashkari Ali ibn Musa ibn Fadl ibn Muhammad ibn Shaddad was the sixth Shaddadid emir, after murdering his father Musa.

Sources
 
 

Emirs of Ganja
Kurdish rulers
11th-century rulers in Asia
1049 deaths
11th-century Kurdish people